The Ministry of Construction, Spatial Planning and State Property of the Republic of Croatia is the ministry in the Government of Croatia which is in charge of construction.

The total amount of budget funds allocated to the combined Ministry Construction and the Ministry of the Environment was 699 million HRK  (ca. 90 million EUR).

The government agencies in the jurisdiction of the Ministry have included:
 Environmental Protection Agency
 Agency for Real Estate Brokerage
 State Geodetic Administration
 Croatian Geodetic Institute

List of ministers

Ministers of Construction and Physical Planning (1990–2020)

Ministers of Construction, Spatial Planning and State Property (2020–present)

Notes
 nb 1.  Served as Minister of Construction, Housing-Communal Works, and Protection of Human Environment
nb 2.  Served as Minister of Environment, Physical Planning and Construction
nb 3.  Served as Minister of Construction and Environment
nb 4.  Served as Minister of Physical Planning, Construction and Housing
nb 5.  Served as Minister of Public Works, Construction and Reconstruction
nb 6.  Served as Minister of Environment Protection, Spatial Planning and Construction

See also
 Ministry of State Property (Croatia)
 Ministry of Environmental and Nature Protection (Croatia)

References

External links
 

Construction and Spatial Planning
Croatia
Croatia